Sant Martí de Llémena is a municipality in the comarca of Gironès in 
Catalonia, Spain.

Villages
Granollers de Rocacorba, 63
Llorà, 343
Sant Martí de Llémena, 83
Les Serres, 20

References

 Panareda Clopés, Josep Maria; Rios Calvet, Jaume; Rabella Vives, Josep Maria (1989). Guia de Catalunya, Barcelona: Caixa de Catalunya.  (Spanish).  (Catalan).

External links 

Pàgina web de l'Ajuntament
Pàgina web de la Comunitat de Municipis de la Vall de Llémena
 Government data pages 

Municipalities in Gironès
Populated places in Gironès